is a song released by Japanese singer Kyary Pamyu Pamyu, released digitally on April 11, 2018 by Warner Music Japan sublabel Unborde. This is the singer's first music release since "Harajuku Iyahoi" and "Easta" in 2017.

Music video
The music video for the song was released on the same day, April 11, 2018. It was directed by longtime collaborator Tamukai Jun.

Commercial performance
The song debuted in the Oricon Daily Digital Singles Chart at number eight, and later at number 18 of the Oricon Weekly Digital Singles chart with 4,055 downloads.

Track listing

Charts

References

2018 singles
2018 songs
Kyary Pamyu Pamyu songs
New jack swing songs
Song recordings produced by Yasutaka Nakata
Songs written by Yasutaka Nakata
Unborde singles
Japanese songs
J-pop songs
Songs about friendship
Songs about loyalty